Adolf Weinacker (born October 29, 1928) is an American racewalker. He competed in the men's 50 kilometres walk at the 1948, 1952 and the 1956 Summer Olympics.

References

1928 births
Living people
Athletes (track and field) at the 1948 Summer Olympics
Athletes (track and field) at the 1952 Summer Olympics
Athletes (track and field) at the 1956 Summer Olympics
American male racewalkers
Olympic track and field athletes of the United States
Place of birth missing (living people)